Henri Leconte was the champion of the event when it last took place, in 1988. He participated in 1990 but lost in the first round.Boris Becker won the title, defeating Carl-Uwe Steeb 7–5, 6–2, 6–2, in the final.

Seeds

Draw

Finals

Top half

Bottom half

References
General

Singles